Pelican Rapids Municipal Airport  is a city-owned public-use airport located four miles north of the central business district of Pelican Rapids, a city in Otter Tail County, Minnesota, United States.

Facilities and aircraft 
Pelican Rapids Municipal Airport covers an area of 240 acres which contains one runway designated 15/33 with a 3,260 x 150 ft (994 x 46 m) turf surface. For the 12-month period ending August 31, 2011, the airport had 2,050 aircraft operations, an average of 39 per week: 100% general aviation. At that time there were 15 aircraft based at this airport: 15 single-engine.

References

External links 

Airports in Minnesota
Buildings and structures in Otter Tail County, Minnesota
Transportation in Otter Tail County, Minnesota